South Hampton may refer to:
 South Hampton, New Hampshire, USA
 South Hampton Roads, Virginia, USA

See also
 Southampton